The 1984–85 VCU Rams men's basketball team represented Virginia Commonwealth University during the 1984–85 NCAA Division I men's basketball season. Their head coach is Mike Rhoades, his fourth year as VCU head coach. The team will play its home games at the Siegel Center in Richmond, Virginia, as a member of the Atlantic 10 Conference.

This would be the final season where the team was ranked until 2012–13 season.

Schedule and results

|-
!colspan=6 style=|Non-conference regular season

|-
!colspan=6 style=|Sun Belt regular season
|-

|-
!colspan=6 style=|Sun Belt tournament
|-

|-
!colspan=6 style=|NCAA tournament
|-

|-
|}

Rankings

References 

Vcu
VCU Rams men's basketball seasons
VCU Rams men's basketball
VCU Rams men's basketball
Vcu